The Kriegshaber House, now the Wrecking Bar Brewpub, is a historic Beaux-Arts mansion on 292 Moreland Avenue NW in Inman Park, Atlanta. It was built around 1900. Victor Hugo Kriegshaber (1859–1934) was founder and president of the Atlanta Terra Cotta Company as well as director of the Atlanta Art Glass Co. and vice-president of the National Builders' Supply Association.

The building is listed on the National Register of Historic Places, both individually and as a contributing property to the Inman Park-Moreland Historic District but is also listed separately on the national register. The building is also designated as a historic building by the City of Atlanta.

References

Houses completed in 1900
Houses in Atlanta
Beaux-Arts architecture in Georgia (U.S. state)
Willis F. Denny buildings
National Register of Historic Places in Atlanta
Houses on the National Register of Historic Places in Georgia (U.S. state)
City of Atlanta-designated historic sites